Nikaia, shown as Nikea on the official map, is a station on Athens Metro Line 3. A part of the  extension, the station opened on July 7, 2020, along with Phase I of the extension. It served as the line's western terminus until 2022.

Location
The station is located under Eleftheriou Venizelou Square in Nikaia.

Station description
The station can be accessed by three ground-level entrances, one of which is glass-covered. All of the entrances lead to the concourse level. The concourse level is rectangular, daylight-penetrated by a single rectangular shaft on the ceiling, with white walls. The concourse level's ceiling is triangular and coloured vermilion vermilion. The platforms are on a northeast-southwest axis and each platform's decoration is divided in two sections. The north side's walls are covered with curved white metal panels. In the south section the platforms are slightly wider, the ceiling is supported by white cylindrical pillars and the walls are covered with blue metal panels. The southern tip of the platforms is covered with polished granite tiles. The ceiling is white and the part above the tracks is covered with curved white metal panels.

Exits

References

Athens Metro stations
Nikaia-Agios Ioannis Rentis
Railway stations opened in 2020
2020 establishments in Greece